The 1949 Winter Deaflympics officially known as the I International Winter Games for the Deaf is an international multi-sport event that was held from 26 January 1949 to 30 January 1949. This event was hosted by Austria.

History
This event was introduced as a result of the success of the Summer Deaflympics which was introduced in 1924.

The event held just after the end of World War II and the Games held coinciding the 1949 Summer Deaflympics.

Only 5 Nations participated at the inaugural Winter Deaflympics including the host nation Austria. The other nations were Finland, Czechoslovakia, Sweden and Switzerland. Alpine skiing and Cross-country skiing were the only sports being introduced at the competition.

Women were not allowed to participate at the inaugural Winter Deaflympics.

Medal table

References 

Deaflympics
February 1949 sports events in Europe
International sports competitions hosted by Austria
1949 in multi-sport events
1949 in Austrian sport
Multi-sport events in Austria
Parasports in Austria